Carinastele is a genus of sea snails, marine gastropod mollusks in the family Calliostomatidae.

Species
Species within the genus Carinastele include:
 Carinastele coronata Marshall, 1988
 Carinastele jugosa Marshall, 1988
 Carinastele kristelleae Marshall, 1988
 Carinastele niceterium (Hedley & May, 1908)
 Carinastele wareni Vilvens, 2014

References

 Marshall B.A. (1988) Thysanodontinae: A new subfamily of the Trochidae (Gastropoda). Journal of Molluscan Studies 54: 215–229. page(s): 220

External links

 
Calliostomatidae